Matamua Seumanu Vasati Pulufana is a Samoan politician and Cabinet Minister. She is a member of the FAST Party.

Matamua is the wife of former MP Tiata Sili Pulufana and is a former educator. She was first elected to the Legislative Assembly of Samoa in the 2021 Samoan general election, defeating finance minister Sili Epa Tuioti. On 24 May 2021 she was appointed Minister of Justice and Courts Administration in the elected cabinet of Fiamē Naomi Mataʻafa. The appointment was disputed by the caretaker government. On 23 July 2021 the Court of Appeal ruled that the swearing-in ceremony was constitutional and binding, and that FAST had been the government since 24 May.

In December 2021 Matamua suspended the appointment process for the Deputy President for the Land and Titles Court of Samoa on the grounds that a "drafting error" in the Land and Titles Bill meant that there were no legal provisions for appointments to the court. Attorney-General Su'a Hellene Wallwork subsequently issued a formal opinion that the lack of appointment provisions meant that no appointments could be made until further legislation had been passed, and that the Komisi o Fa'amasinoga o Fanua ma Suafa, intended to be an appointments and supervisory body for the court, was legally powerless. On this basis, Matamua ordered the Ministry of Justice and Courts Administration not to progress the appointments in any way. Despite this, on 17 December 2021 Fepulea'i purported to swear in Faimalomatumua and two other judges without warrants of appointment from the O le Ao o le Malo, claiming the appointments were "made by God".

Notes

References

|-

Living people
Members of the Legislative Assembly of Samoa
Women government ministers of Samoa
Faʻatuatua i le Atua Samoa ua Tasi politicians
Year of birth missing (living people)